Isidro Márquez Espinoza (born May 14, 1965) is a Mexican former professional baseball pitcher. He played in Major League Baseball (MLB) for the Chicago White Sox.

Career
Márquez played during one season at the major league level for the Chicago White Sox. He was purchased by the Los Angeles Dodgers from the Mexican League's Tuneros de San Luis in 1988. Márquez played his first professional season (in American baseball) with their Class A-Advanced Bakersfield Dodgers in 1988, and his last affiliated season with the White Sox and their Triple-A Nashville Sounds in 1995.

In 2000, he made a comeback with the Piratas de Campeche of the Mexican League. He pitched in Mexico through 2011.

In 2020, Márquez was inducted into the Mexican Professional Baseball Hall of Fame.

In 2021, the Piratas retired Márquez's 33 number.

References

External links

1965 births
Living people
Albuquerque Dukes players
Alijadores de Tampico players
Bakersfield Dodgers players
Baseball players from Sonora
Broncos de Reynosa players
Chicago White Sox players
Major League Baseball pitchers
Major League Baseball players from Mexico
Mayos de Navojoa players
Mexican expatriate baseball players in the United States
Mexican Baseball Hall of Fame inductees
Mexican League baseball pitchers
Nashville Sounds players
Olmecas de Tabasco players
Petroleros de Minatitlán players
Piratas de Campeche players
Rojos del Águila de Veracruz players
San Antonio Missions players
Tigres del México players
Tuneros de San Luis Potosí players
People from Navojoa